In Our Time may refer to:
In Our Time (1944 film), a film starring Ida Lupino and Paul Henreid
In Our Time (1982 film), a Taiwanese anthology film featuring director Edward Yang; considered the beginning of the "New Taiwan Cinema"
In Our Time (short story collection), a collection of short stories by Ernest Hemingway
In Our Time (Wolfe book),  a collection of illustrations by Tom Wolfe
In Our Time (EP), an EP by Cuff the Duke
In Our Time (radio series), a BBC discussion programme hosted by Melvyn Bragg
In Our Time, a book by Susan Brownmiller
In Our Time, a book by William Manchester

See also
In Your Time, an album by Taylor Hicks
Nostra aetate (Latin: "In our time"), the 1965 Declaration on the Relation of the Catholic Church with Non-Christian Religions  
Peace in our time (disambiguation)